Noga Alon (born 17 February 1956) is an Israeli mathematician and a professor of mathematics at Princeton University noted for his contributions to combinatorics and theoretical computer science, having authored hundreds of papers.

Academic background 
Alon is a Professor of Mathematics at Princeton University and a Baumritter Professor Emeritus of Mathematics and Computer Science at Tel Aviv University, Israel. He graduated from the Hebrew Reali School in 1974 and received his Ph.D. in Mathematics at the Hebrew University of Jerusalem in 1983 and had visiting positions in various research institutes including MIT, The Institute for Advanced Study in Princeton, IBM Almaden Research Center, Bell Labs, Bellcore and Microsoft Research. He serves on the editorial boards of more than a dozen international journals; since 2008 he is the editor-in-chief of Random Structures and Algorithms. He has given lectures in many conferences, including plenary addresses in the 1996 European Congress of Mathematics and in the 2002 International Congress of Mathematicians, the 2009   Turán Memorial Lectures, and a lecture in the 1990 International Congress of Mathematicians.

Research 
Alon has published more than five hundred research papers, mostly in combinatorics and in theoretical computer science, and one book. He has also published under the pseudonym "A. Nilli".

Alon is the principal founder of the Combinatorial Nullstellensatz which has many applications in combinatorics and number theory.

Selected works

Books 
 1992. The Probabilistic Method. (with Joel Spencer)  Wiley.

Articles 
 1996. The space complexity of approximating the frequency moments. (with Yossi Matias and Mario Szegedy) ACM STOC '96.
 won their Gödel Prize in 2005.
 1987. The monotone circuit complexity of Boolean functions. (with Ravi B Boppana). Combinatorica 1987, Volume 7, Issue 1
 1986. Eigenvalues and expanders. Combinatorica 1986, Volume 6, Issue 2.

Awards 

Alon has received a number of awards, including the following:
 1989 – Erdős Prize;
 1991 – Feher Prize;
 2000 – Pólya Prize;
 2001 – Bruno Memorial Award;
 2005 – Landau Prize; 
 2005 – Gödel Prize (with Yossi Matias and Mario Szegedy); for their foundational contribution to streaming algorithms.
 2008 – Israel Prize, for mathematics.
 2011 – EMET Prize, for mathematics.
 2021 – Leroy P. Steele Prize for Mathematical Exposition (jointly with Joel Spencer).
 2022 – Shaw Prize in Mathematical Sciences
 2022 – Knuth Prize

In addition, Alon has been a member of the Israel Academy of Sciences and Humanities since 1997. In 2015 he was elected as a fellow of the American Mathematical Society and gave the Łojasiewicz Lecture (on the "Signrank and its applications in combinatorics and complexity") at the Jagiellonian University in Kraków. In 2017 he became a Fellow of the Association for Computing Machinery.

See also 
 Necklace splitting problem
 Color-coding
 List of Israel Prize recipients
 Alon–Boppana bound

References

External links 
 Noga Alon's home page
 
 Author profile in the database zbMATH 
  h-index is 109.

Living people
Israel Prize in mathematics recipients
Israel Defense Prize recipients
Israeli mathematicians
Israeli computer scientists
20th-century Israeli mathematicians
21st-century  Israeli  mathematicians
Combinatorialists
Gödel Prize laureates
EMET Prize recipients in the Exact Sciences
Institute for Advanced Study visiting scholars
Einstein Institute of Mathematics alumni
Hebrew Reali School alumni
Academic staff of Tel Aviv University
Jewish scientists
Knuth Prize laureates
Members of the Israel Academy of Sciences and Humanities
Fellows of the American Mathematical Society
Fellows of the Association for Computing Machinery
1956 births
Technion – Israel Institute of Technology alumni
Tel Aviv University alumni
Princeton University faculty
Erdős Prize recipients